Petrovo, Petrovo Selo is a Slavic toponym. The word Petrovo means Peter's. It can refer to:

Places

Bosnia and Herzegovina 
Petrovo, Bosnia and Herzegovina, or Bosansko Petrovo Selo, a town and municipality in Republika Srpska
Petrovo Selo, Gradiška, a village in Gradiška Municipality, Republika Srpska

Serbia
Bačko Petrovo Selo, a village in Bečej Municipality
Petrovo Selo (Kladovo), a village in Kladovo Municipality

Croatia
Baranjsko Petrovo Selo, a village in Osijek-Baranja County
Staro Petrovo Selo, a village and municipality in Brod-Posavina County
Ličko Petrovo Selo, a village in the Lika-Senj County
, a village in the Dubrovnik-Neretva County

Other countries
Petrovo, Gevgelija, a village in North Macedonia
Petrovo-Dalneye, a village in Russia
Petrovo, Bulgaria, one of three villages of that name in Bulgaria, a.o. Petrovo, Blagoevgrad Province
Petrovo, Rožňava District, a village and municipality in the Rožňava District, Slovakia

See also
 Petrovo Polje (disambiguation)
Petrovo Vrelo, a village and spring (Vrelo) in Glamoč municipality, Bosnia and Herzegovina
Petrovo Brdo, a village in Slovenia
Petrove, a town in Central Ukraine